Morgan Chauntel Nick (September 12, 1988 – disappeared June 9, 1995) is an American girl who was abducted at a Little League Baseball game. Her mother is known for creating the Morgan Nick Foundation, which helps people find their missing children.

Disappearance
On June 9, 1995, Morgan Nick and her mother, Colleen Nick, went to a Little League baseball game in the town of Alma, Arkansas. At around 10:30 p.m., Morgan asked her mother if she could catch fireflies with her friends. At first, her mother was uncertain, but eventually let her go. She was last seen at 10:45 p.m. by her friends, emptying sand out of her shoes alone near her mother's car while her group of friends emptied their shoes a few dozen feet away. Morgan's friends reported seeing a "creepy" man talking to Morgan as she was putting her shoes back on.

When the game ended shortly thereafter, Morgan's friends returned without her. They told Colleen that Morgan was at her car, but when Colleen returned to the car, Morgan was not there. She has not been seen or heard from since.

Later developments
On January 15, 2002, police conducted a dig on a private piece of land in Booneville, Arkansas, after they received a tip that claimed Nick might have been buried there. The tip was "so specific" that police decided to dig; a police dog was also used in the search. Police ended the investigation at 9:30 pm and said they did not intend to return to the property.

On November 15, 2010, federal investigators searched a vacant house in Spiro, Oklahoma for DNA evidence that could show Nick had once been in the house. On December 18, 2017, investigators returned to the house to conduct another search after they received a tip about the case. Cadaver dogs alerted investigators to a well on the property, which they said was the "center of the investigation". The search was called off on December 19, after no evidence was found. As of 2021, new leads in Nick's disappearance continue to be received and "investigated at the local state and federal level".

In November 2021, police named Billy Jack Lincks as a person of interest in their investigation. Lincks, who died in 2000, drove a red pickup truck that had been the focus on their investigation since the beginning in 1995. The FBI said that fibers found in the truck were a close match for those from Morgan's t-shirt.

Aftermath

In 1996, Colleen Nick started the Morgan Nick Foundation, which helps parents cope with the disappearances of children, and helps prevent children from going missing. Her case was featured on both Unsolved Mysteries and America's Most Wanted, while Morgan's family and the foundation were featured in 2005 on Extreme Makeover: Home Edition after the family's house was damaged in a water heater explosion.

The AMBER Alert service is named the Morgan Nick Amber Alert in the state of Arkansas.

In August 2012, Tonya Smith and James Monhart, two previously convicted felons, were arrested for computer fraud after attempting to assume the identity of Morgan Nick.

In February 2023, Still Missing Morgan, a four part ABC News Studios docuseries executive produced by Ridley Scott, was released on Hulu.

See also
List of people who disappeared

References

External links
Morgan Nick Foundation

1988 births
1990s missing person cases
1995 in Arkansas
Kidnapped American children
Missing American children
People from Crawford County, Arkansas
Possibly living people
Missing person cases in Arkansas
June 1995 events in the United States
Incidents of violence against girls